Royal Air Force Harwell or more simply RAF Harwell is a former Royal Air Force station, near the village of Harwell, located  south east of Wantage, Oxfordshire and  north west of Reading, Berkshire, England.

The site is now the Harwell Science and Innovation Campus which includes the Rutherford Appleton Laboratory.

History

The airfield was built by John Laing & Son Ltd at the junction of three parishes in 1935. The bulk lay within Chilton parish; about a third was in East Hendred; and the smallest portion was in Harwell. The first Commanding Officer, upon being asked what the name of the new airfield should be, responded that it should be named after the parish in which his house lay – and this happened to be Harwell.

From its opening in February 1937 until March 1944, various bomber squadrons were stationed at the airfield. On the outbreak of the Second World War, it became part of No. 38 Group RAF, initially used for leaflet missions over France using Vickers Wellington bombers, later bombing raids on Bremen, Cologne and Essen.  There were numerous Luftwaffe raids on the airfield from August 1940 until September 1941. The original grass field was replaced with concrete runways between July and November 1941.

The following squadrons were posted to Harwell:

The following units were also here at some point:

In March 1944, it was reallocated to 30 Group Airborne Forces, where it mainly operated tug aircraft towing Airspeed Horsa which were used in a number of operations. These included carrying the first glider-borne troops into Normandy to secure vital strategic positions in advance of the main landings on D-Day. A memorial to the men who flew from RAF Harwell who were killed on this operation now exists at one edge of the old airfield site, and a memorial service is held there annually. The airfield was also used briefly for Special Operations Executive (SOE) operations between July and September 1944.

Closure and subsequent use

The RAF station was closed at the end of 1945 and the site transferred to the Ministry of Supply on 1 January 1946, where it became the Atomic Energy Research Establishment.  Over the years that reduced in scale and other science-based research moved in, such as the Rutherford Appleton Laboratory in 1957.  The site is now home to the Harwell Science and Innovation Campus.

References

Citations

Bibliography

External links

www.atlantikwall.co.uk RAF Harwell 
Control towers website

1937 establishments in England
1944 disestablishments in England
Royal Air Force stations in Oxfordshire
Royal Air Force stations of World War II in the United Kingdom